The Cyber Security Agency (CSA) is a government agency under the Prime Minister's Office, but is managed by the Ministry of Communications and Information of the Government of Singapore. It provides centralised oversight of national cyber security functions, and works with sector leads to protect Singapore's Critical Information Infrastructure (CII), such as the energy and banking sectors. Formed on 1 April 2015, the agency also engages with various industries and stakeholders to heighten cyber security awareness as well as to ensure the development of Singapore's cyber security. It is headed by the Commissioner of Cybersecurity, David Koh.

History and overview
The Cyber Security Agency took over the functions previously carried out by the Singapore Infocomm Technology Security Authority (SITSA), under the Ministry of Home Affairs. SITSA was set up in 2009 as the national specialist authority overseeing operational IT security.

The CSA also took over some roles undertaken by the then-Infocomm Development of Authority (IDA) such as the Singapore Computer Emergency Response Team (SingCERT), which facilitates the detection, resolution and prevention of security-related incidents on the Internet.

The agency builds upon the government's cyber security capabilities, which include strategy and policy development, cyber security operations, industry development and outreach; as well as public communications and engagement.

It has organised events such as the Singapore International Cyber Week (SICW) in 2016, with over 5,000 attendees from close to 50 countries. The SICW also saw the launch of Singapore's Cybersecurity Strategy.

In 2017, the second edition of the SICW was held from 18 to 21 September 2017. It also hosted the 2nd ASEAN Ministerial Conference on Cybersecurity.

Singapore's Cybersecurity Strategy 
In October 2016, then-Prime Minister Lee Hsien Loong launched Singapore's Cybersecurity Strategy with the aim to create a resilient and trusted cyber environment for Singapore. Four pillars underpinned the strategy:
 Building a Resilient Infrastructure
 Creating a Safer Cyberspace 
 Developing a Vibrant Cybersecurity Ecosystem
 Strengthening International Partnerships
Singapore's revised goals were outlined in the Singapore Cybersecurity Strategy 2021. As a result, Singapore's cybersecurity plan, which was originally implemented in 2016, was reviewed and updated.

Cutting off internet access
In 2016, as part of Singapore's Cybersecurity Strategy, it was announced that internet access of civil servants' work station will be cut-off. David Koh, chief executive of the then-newly formed agency, said officials realised there was too much data to secure and "there is no way to secure this because the attack surface is like a building with a zillion windows, doors, fire escapes".

Security experts commented that the move may only raise the defense against cyber attack slightly but risk damaging productivity of civil servants and those working at more than four dozen statutory boards, and cutting them off from the people they serve.

Singapore's Cybersecurity Programmes 
Singapore Cyber Security Agency has launched various programmes to support its strategy, including:

 CSA Common Criteria
 CSAT Programme
 Cybersecurity Labelling Scheme  
 Cybersecurity Career Mentoring Programme
 Cybersecurity Co-innovation and Development Fund
 ICE71 
 PSG Cybersecurity Solutions
 SG Cyber Safe Seniors
 SG Cyber Safe Students
 SG Cyber Talent.  These initiatives include: 
 Cyber Security Associates and Technologists (CSAT) programme with Infocomm Media Development Authority (IMDA);
 Cybersecurity Career Mentoring programme with the Singapore Computer Society (SCS);
 SG Cyber Women initiative;
 SG Cyber Educators Programme; and
 SG Cyber Youth Programme.
 SG Cyber Safe Programme.
Singapore’s Cyber Security Agency launched a new cyber security certification scheme recognizing organisations with good cyber security practices at the end of March 2022.

See also 
 National Cyber Security Centre
 Government Technology Agency (GovTech)

References

External links
 

Surveillance
Computer security organizations
Cyberwarfare
Communications authorities
Regulation in Singapore
2015 establishments in Singapore
Government agencies established in 2015
Organizations established in 2015